The Khasi–Palaungic languages are a primary branch of the Austroasiatic language family of Southeast Asia in the classification of Sidwell (2011, 2018). This is a departure from Diffloth (2005) classification of Khasi-Khmuic with Khmuic and Mangic (Pakanic) now being separate branches within Austroasiatic family.

Languages
As per the classification of Sidwell (2011) and (2018), the Khasi–Palaungic languages are as follows:

 'Khasi–Palaungic
 Khasic: War, Lyngngam, Khasi... 
 Palaungic: Palaung, Riang, Blang , Wa...

Footnotes

References
Diffloth, Gérard 2005. "The contribution of linguistic palaeontology and Austroasiatic". in Laurent Sagart, Roger Blench and Alicia Sanchez-Mazas, eds. The Peopling of East Asia: Putting Together Archaeology, Linguistics and Genetics. 77–80. London: Routledge Curzon.
Sidwell, Paul. 2011. "". Proto-Khasian and Khasi-Palaungic. Austroasiatic Languages Project. Australian National University
Sidwell, Paul. 2014. "Khmuic classification and homeland". Mon-Khmer Studies'' 43.1:47-56